Sciopsyche tropica is a moth in the subfamily Arctiinae. It was described by Francis Walker in 1854. It is found in Costa Rica, Honduras, Colombia, Paraguay and Brazil (Ega, Espirito Santo) and Argentina.

References

Moths described in 1854
Arctiinae